Eyo Ufuo is an Oron village in Eyulor community of Urue-Offong/Oruko local government area of Akwa Ibom state in Nigeria.

History
Eyo Ufuo was formed by Ufuo son of Ullor whose father was Ekete Okpo.

References 

Places in Oron Nation
Villages in Akwa Ibom